Marion Patton "Pat"  Echols Jr. (October 1, 1925 – July 26, 2012) was an attorney in northern Virginia who served briefly as the only Republican to represent Arlington County in the Virginia Senate. He was also an unsuccessful candidate for Attorney General of Virginia in 1973.

Early life
Echols was the son of Colonel Marion Patton Echols and Nancy Patterson McArthur. He was born October 1, 1925, in Honolulu in the U.S. territory of Hawaii. He married the former Susanne Stokes in 1956 and they raised two sons and two daughters in Arlington. They later divorced, and Echols married Beth McLaren in 2005.

Political career
In 1963, Echols switched from the Democratic to the Republican Party and was one of three Republican candidates for the three House of Delegates seats allocated to Arlington and elected countywide, at-large. He came in fifth with 9,139 votes.

In February 1969, longtime Virginia State Senator Charles R. Fenwick who represented the 9th District died. In the snap special election in March, Echols was elected as a Republican over the expected victor C. Harrison Mann.  He served the balance of Fenwick's term. However, as a result of the decennial redistricting and creation of single-member districts in 1971, his old numbered district was moved to Richmond and he ran in the 31st District. Echols then lost to Democratic delegate Clive Duval, who would win re-election many times.

Republicans tapped Echols in 1973 for the "unenviable task" of running against popular incumbent Virginia Attorney General Andy Miller, and Miller won in a landslide.

Later years

Echols practiced law for many years in Arlington and resided in McLean, Virginia. He died on July 26, 2012, and a memorial service was held at Grace Episcopal Church in Alexandria. He was buried at the University of Virginia Cemetery in Charlottesville.

References

1925 births
2012 deaths
Republican Party Virginia state senators
People from Arlington County, Virginia
Burials at the University of Virginia Cemetery